Huailai is a county in northwestern Hebei province, People's Republic of China, under the administration of the prefecture-level city of Zhangjiakou.

Huailai County is a center for grape wine production, with the China Great Wall Wine Company, Ltd. headquartered in the town of Shacheng. Huailai Tianyuan Special Type Glass Co., Ltd. is also located in Huailai County.

Geography
Huailai County is located in the eastern part of Zhangjiakou prefecture, with latitude ranging from 40° 04′ to 40° 35′ N and longitude 115° 16′ to 115° 58′ E. It contains the upper reaches of the Yongding River and borders Beijing Municipality.

Huailai County has a monsoon-influenced, continental semi-arid climate (Köppen BSk), with cold, dry, and windy winters and hot, humid summers, with temperatures slightly warmer than Zhangjiakou due to the more southerly location but still significantly cooler than in Beijing due to the high elevation. A majority of the annual rainfall occurs in July and August alone. With monthly percent possible sunshine ranging from 60% in July to 73% in January and February, sunshine is abundant year-round, totalling about 3,030 hours annually.

Administrative divisions
There are 11 towns, five townships and one ethnic township in the county:

Towns (镇)

Townships (乡)
Langshan Township
Jimingyi Township
Dongbali Township
Ruiyunguan Township
Sunzhuangzi Township
Wangjialou Hui Ethnic Township

References

External links

 
County-level divisions of Hebei
Wine regions of China
Zhangjiakou